Mark Brendan Naley (11 March 1961 – 6 July 2020) was an Australian rules footballer who played with  in the VFL/AFL and South Adelaide in the South Australian National Football League (SANFL).

Heritage
Growing up, Naley had been told that his paternal grandfather was of Afghan descent. This was to explain away the fact that some family members had darker than usual complexions. Later it came to light that in fact, Naley's grandfather, Charles Gordon Naley, was Aboriginal. Charles had served with the Australian Army at Gallipoli. Wounded and shipped to England for treatment, Charles eventually married his English nurse, Cecilia.

Football career
Coming from Sacred Heart College, Naley joined the junior grades of South Adelaide, going on to make his league debut in 1980. He was a member of the State Youth Team that same year. While at South Adelaide, he earned All Australian selection for his performances in the 1986 and 1987 Interstate Carnivals, the latter also saw him win the Tassie Medal. He represented his state from 1981 to 1989, and again in 1991 and 1992. He also played for Colonel Light Gardens Football Club.

Naley moved from the state based South Australian National Football League to Victorian based VFL when he joined  in 1987. He was a regular member of the side all season, finishing the year with a premiership. He also received 12 Brownlow Medal votes for the year, finishing equal 10th. In 1990 he suffered from hamstring problems and only managed 8 games, as a result he decided to return to his original club South Adelaide, winning the 1991 Magarey Medal before going on to retire in 1993.

In 2002, Naley was an inaugural inductee into the South Australian Football Hall of Fame.

Non-football career

Naley was the owner of Mark Naley Building Services, a company that provides shopfittings for offices and commercial businesses.

He died from brain cancer on 6 July 2020, aged 59.

References

External links

1961 births
2020 deaths
Indigenous Australian players of Australian rules football
Australian rules footballers from South Australia
Carlton Football Club players
Carlton Football Club Premiership players
South Adelaide Football Club players
South Australian State of Origin players
Magarey Medal winners
All-Australians (1953–1988)
South Australian Football Hall of Fame inductees
Australia international rules football team players
Deaths from brain tumor
Deaths from cancer in South Australia
One-time VFL/AFL Premiership players